Elliot Chorley (born September 12, 1931) was a Canadian ice hockey right winger who played 633 professional games, scored 216 goals, 292 assists for a total of 508 career points.

Awards and achievements
MJHL First All-Star Team (1950 & 1951)
MJHL Goal Scoring Leader (1951)
 MJHL Championship (1951)
WHL Championships (1957 & 1958)
IHL Championships (1960 & 1961)
Allan Cup Championship (1964)
"Honoured Member" of the Manitoba Hockey Hall of Fame

External links

Elliot Chorley's biography at Manitoba Hockey Hall of Fame

1931 births
Living people
Brandon Wheat Kings coaches
Canadian ice hockey coaches
Canadian ice hockey right wingers
Ice hockey people from Winnipeg
Winnipeg Monarchs players